Ghyd-Kermeliss-Holly Olonghot (born March 15, 1986 in Brazzaville) is a track and field sprint athlete who competes internationally for the Republic of the Congo.

Olonghot represented Congo at the 2008 Summer Olympics in Beijing. He competed at the 100 metres sprint and placed 7th in his heat without advancing to the second round. He ran the distance in a time of 11.01 seconds.

References

External links

1986 births
Living people
Sportspeople from Brazzaville
Athletes (track and field) at the 2008 Summer Olympics
Republic of the Congo male sprinters
Olympic athletes of the Republic of the Congo